St. Sabbas Orthodox Monastery is a male monastery of the Russian Orthodox Church Outside Russia, located in Harper Woods, Michigan.

St. Sabbas Monastery was founded in 1999 under Archimandrite Pachomy (Belkoff). St. Sabbas is directly under Metropolitan Hilarion (Kapral) of the Russian Orthodox Church Abroad and under Kyrill.

The monastery is in Southeast Michigan on over 6 acres of land with a small but growing community of monastics.  The monastery follows the patristic Julian calendar.

External links
 http://stsabbas.org/ St. Sabbas Monastery
 Chris Handyside The Russians Are Coming... To Harper Woods, May 21, 2009 
 Cтавропигиальный монастырь св. Саввы в Харпер Вудсе

Russian Orthodox monasteries in the United States
Monasteries of the Russian Orthodox Church Outside of Russia